Sargam is a 1950 Bollywood family drama film directed by P. L. Santoshi. It stars Raj Kapoor, Rehana in lead roles, with Om Prakash, David, Radhakrishan in supporting roles. A moderate box office success, the film became the eighth highest-earning Indian film of 1950, earning an approximate gross of Rs. 85,00,000 and a net of Rs. 48,00,000.

Cast
 Raj Kapoor as Vinod
 Rehana as Bhairavi
 Om Prakash as Seth Roopchand
 David as Pandit Shiv Shankar
 Radhakrishan as Babulal

Music
The lyrics were written by P. L. Santoshi, the director himself and the music was composed by C. Ramchandra.

References

External links
 

1950 films
1950s Hindi-language films
1950 drama films
Films scored by C. Ramchandra
Indian drama films
Indian black-and-white films